Henry Largie (December 31, 1940 – November, 2020) was a Jamaican footballer who played as a defender.

Career 
Largie played with YMCA football club in 1959, and continued to play until the 1966 season. In 1966, he played abroad in the National Soccer League with Sudbury Italia. After the conclusion of the NSL season he resumed play in the American Soccer League with Baltimore St. Gerards. In 1967, he played in the National Professional Soccer League with Atlanta Chiefs. In the winter of 1967 he returned to the ASL as he was loaned to Washington Britannica. 

In 1968, he played in the newly formed North American Soccer League with Baltimore Bays. For the remainder of the season he played with league rivals Washington Whips. He returned to his former team Atlanta Chiefs for the 1969 season. He re-signed with Atlanta for the 1970 season. In 1971, he featured in the NASL Final, but Atlanta were defeated by Dallas Tornado in a best-of-three series. He played his final season with Atlanta in 1972.

International career 
Largie played with the Jamaica national football team, and played in the 1962 Central American and Caribbean Games. He also represented Jamaica in the 1966 FIFA World Cup qualification round. He also featured in the 1970 FIFA World Cup qualification round.

References  
 

1940 births
2020 deaths
Association football defenders
Jamaican footballers
Jamaica international footballers
Atlanta Chiefs players
Washington Darts players
Baltimore Bays players
Washington Whips players
Canadian National Soccer League players
American Soccer League (1933–1983) players
National Professional Soccer League (1967) players
North American Soccer League (1968–1984) players
Sportspeople from Kingston, Jamaica